Railway lines in Spain